PROS or Pros may refer to:
 "Pros and Cons", a method of Decision making
 PROS (company), a big data software company
 Republican Party of the Social Order, Brazilian political party, Portuguese name: Partido Republicano da Ordem Social
 PROS (PIK3CA-related overgrowth spectrum), a form of tissue overgrowth

See also
 Pro (disambiguation)